Paul Egli (18 August 1911 – 23 January 1997) was a Swiss professional road bicycle racer. He is most known for his silver and bronze medals in respectively the 1938 and the 1937 UCI Road World Championships. He was also the Swiss National Road Race champion in 1935 and 1936.

Major results

1932
  Amateur Cyclo-Cross Champion
  World Amateur Road Race Championship
1933
  World Amateur Road Race Champion
1934
 Züri-Metzgete
 Stage 3, Tour de Suisse
 Stage 1, Critérium du Midi
1935
  Road Race Champion
 Züri-Metzgete
 Stage 1, Tour of Nord-East-Spain
1936
  Road Race Champion
Tour de France
Winner stage 1
Wearing yellow jersey for one day
 Tour de Suisse:
 Winner Stages 4a & 4b
1937
  World Road Race Championship
Tour de Suisse:
 Winner Stage 3
1938
  World Road Race Championship
1941
 Berner Rundfahrt
1942
 Züri-Metzgete

References

External links 

Official Tour de France results for Paul Egli

1911 births
1997 deaths
Swiss male cyclists
Swiss Tour de France stage winners
People from Hinwil District
Tour de Suisse stage winners
Sportspeople from the canton of Zürich
20th-century Swiss people